Michael Perelman may refer to:
 Michael Perelman (economist) (born 1939), American economist and economic historian
 Michael Perelman (psychologist), American psychologist